Poor Hand Love Song (하수연가) is the third studio album of the Korean rock band Crying Nut.  Oh! What a Shiny Night was a perhaps the biggest hit off the album whilst 'Vicious song' is included in the original sound track of 'Kick the Moon'(신라의 달밤).

This is widely regarded as Crying Nut's best album before their military Service period.

Track listing

Personnel 
 Park, Yoon-Sick  – vocal
 Lee, Sang-Myun  – guitar, voice 
 Han, kyung-Rock  – bass, voice
 Lee, Sang-Hyuk  – drums, voice
 Kim, In-Soo  –  Accordion, Organ

References

External links

2001 albums
Korean-language albums